Anaea andria, known generally as the goatweed leafwing or goatweed butterfly, is a species of leafwing in the butterfly family Nymphalidae. It is found in North America.

The MONA or Hodges number for Anaea andria is 4554.

Subspecies
These two subspecies belong to the species Anaea andria:
 Anaea andria andria
 Anaea andria andriaesta Johnson & Comstock, 1941

References

Further reading

External links

 

Anaeini
Articles created by Qbugbot
Butterflies described in 1875